Daniel Mannix Petrie (November 26, 1920 – August 22, 2004) was a Canadian film, television, and stage director who worked in Canada, Hollywood, and the United Kingdom; known for directing grounded human dramas often dealing with taboo subject matter. He was one of several Canadian-born expatriate filmmakers, including Norman Jewison and Sidney J. Furie, to find critical and commercial success overseas in the 1960s due to the limited opportunities in the Canadian film industry at the time. He was the patriarch of the Petrie filmmaking family, with four of his children all working in the film industry.

Beginning his career in television, he made his critical and popular breakthrough directing the 1961 film version of the Lorraine Hansberry play A Raisin in the Sun, which won the Gary Cooper Award at the Cannes Film Festival. He directed over 90 films and television programs until his retirement in 2001, winning several accolades (including three Primetime Emmy Awards) in the process. His semi-autobiographical 1984 film The Bay Boy won the Genie Award for Best Motion Picture.

Throughout his life, Petrie maintained strong ties to the academic world, serving as the deputy chairman of the American Film Institute from 1986 to 1987.

Early life and education
Petrie was born in Glace Bay, Nova Scotia, Canada, the son of Mary Anne (née Campbell) and William Mark Petrie, a soft-drink manufacturer. He achieved a Bachelor of Arts in Communications at St. Francis Xavier University before completing a Masters in adult education at Columbia University. Petrie also served in the Canadian Army during World War II.

He moved to the United States in 1945, and began his career teaching at Northwestern University and Creighton University, where he was head of the theatre department until 1950. Although Petrie stopped teaching, he maintained a strong relationship with the academic world throughout his career, holding a faculty position at the American Film Institute, where he also acted as deputy chairman from 1986 to 1987.

Career
Petrie started working as a television director in 1950. His signature film A Raisin in the Sun (1961) was assigned to him after it was refused to its original director on Broadway, future National Medal of Arts honoree Lloyd Richards, because Richards was black. The movie maintained the award-winning cast and performances it had had on Broadway during its two-year successful run under Richards' direction, and the film version was nominated for the Palme d'Or award at the Cannes Film Festival. Petrie went on to have a fulfilling movie directing career because of the success of this movie; Richards did not get an opportunity to direct a movie again until 1995.

Petrie directed Buster and Billie (1974); the Academy Award-nominated Resurrection (1980); Fort Apache, The Bronx (1981); and Cocoon: The Return (1988).

Petrie also directed television movies, such as Sybil, Eleanor and Franklin, Eleanor and Franklin: The White House Years, The Dollmaker, My Name Is Bill W., Mark Twain and Me, Kissinger and Nixon, Inherit the Wind, and Wild Iris.

Petrie's theatrical films were rarely box-office successes, but they often featured large, well-known casts, such as The Betsy (1978), starring Laurence Olivier, Tommy Lee Jones and Robert Duvall. His films feature the earliest starring screen appearances by such stars as Winona Ryder (Square Dance - she first appeared in a supporting role in Lucas) and Kiefer Sutherland (The Bay Boy). As a television director he won multiple Emmy and Directors Guild of America Awards.

Death
Petrie died of cancer in 2004 in Los Angeles, California, at the age of 83.

Filmography

Film

Television

Telefilms and limited series

Awards and nominations

Film festivals

The Petrie family
Petrie was married for 57 years to Dorothea Grundy Petrie, an Emmy-winning film and television producer. Their sons were Daniel and Donald, both successful directors and screenwriters. Their twin daughters were former MGM executive June and actor/writer Mary. In 2002, the family as a whole was awarded the American Film Institute's Platinum Circle Award to recognise their collective creative contributions.

References

External links
Canadian Film Encyclopedia [A publication of The Film Reference Library/a division of the Toronto International Film Festival Group]

1920 births
2004 deaths
Canadian expatriate film directors in the United States
Film directors from Nova Scotia
Deaths from cancer in California
Best Screenplay Genie and Canadian Screen Award winners
People from Glace Bay
Directors Guild of America Award winners
Primetime Emmy Award winners
Film directors from Los Angeles
20th-century screenwriters
Canadian expatriates in the United Kingdom
Canadian expatriates in the United States